Cornelis Brouwer (27 November 1900 – 7 May 1952) was a Dutch long-distance runner. He competed in the marathon at the 1924 Summer Olympics.

References

External links
 

1900 births
1952 deaths
Athletes (track and field) at the 1924 Summer Olympics
Dutch male long-distance runners
Dutch male marathon runners
Olympic athletes of the Netherlands
Athletes from Rotterdam
20th-century Dutch people